System 10 or System Ten may refer to:

Computing
 DECsystem-10, the  mainframe line by Digital Equipment Corporation
 Singer System 10, the business minicomputer
 IBM System z10, the mainframe line by IBM
 Namco System 10, the arcade system board
 Tandy 10 Business Computer System, the business minicomputer

Operating systems
 Android 10, the Google operating system
 BlackBerry 10, the BlackBerry operating system
 Linux distribution versions:
 Debian 10, the Debian Project distribution (2019)
 Fedora 10, the RedHat-based distribution (2008)
 Gentoo 10, the special release of Gentoo distribution (2009)
 Mandriva 10, the Mandriva distribution (2004)
 Mint 10, the Ubuntu-based distribution (2010)
 openSUSE 10, the openSUSE Project distribution (2005)
 Ubuntu 10.4 and Ubuntu 10.10, the Canonical distribution (2010)
 Mac OS X, the Apple operating system now known as macOS
 TOPS-10, the Digital Equipment Corporation operating system
 FTOS, the Force10 operating system
 FreeBSD 10, the FreeBSD Project operating system
 Version 10 Unix, the last version of the original Unix of Bell Labs
 Windows 10, the Microsoft operating system

Sports
 10-point must system, the boxing strategy
 Perfect 10 (gymnastics), the scoring system

Other
 Base-ten number system, the decimal numeral system 
 ICD-10 Procedure Coding System, the system of medical classification
 Pentax System 10, the Pentax single-lens camera
 STS-10 (Space Transportation System-10), a cancelled Space Shuttle mission

See also

 System X (disambiguation)
 OSX (disambiguation)
 OS 10